Eupithecia perryvriesi is a moth in the  family Geometridae. It is found on the Galapagos Islands.

References

Moths described in 1971
perryvriesi
Moths of South America